Mohammad Aslam Watanjar (1946 – November 2000) was an Afghan general and politician. He played a significant role in the coup in 1978 that killed the Afghan president Mohammad Daud Khan and started the "Saur Revolution". Watanjar later became a member of the politburo in the Soviet-backed Democratic Republic of Afghanistan.

Early life
An Andar Ghilzai Pashtun from Zurmula in Paktia, Aslam Watanjar trained as a tank officer in the Soviet Union following his graduation from the Military Academy in Kabul in 1967.

The Saur Revolution
Watanjar's role in the communist coup of 1978 was important. Instructed by Hafizullah Amin, he initiated the march of tank forces from the motorized forces of numbers 4 and 15 near Pul-e-Charkhi against the government.

Colonel Aslam Watanjar was the Army commander on the ground during the Coup, and his troops gained control of Kabul. Colonel Abdul Qadir, the leader of the Air Force squadrons, also launched a major attack on the Royal Palace, in the course of which Mohammed Daoud Khan was killed. Watanjar was present when corpses of the president and his family were buried in a pit.

Colonel Watanjar was also in charge of the announcement over Radio Kabul, in the Pashtu language, that a Revolutionary Council of the Armed Forces had been established, with Colonel Abdul Qadir at its head. The council's initial statement of principles, issued late in the evening of April 27, was a noncommittal affirmation of Islamic, democratic, and non-aligned ideals.

He was in charge of the operation until Amin took over from him in the evening. On April 30 the RC issued the first of a series of fateful decrees. The decree formally abolished the military's revolutionary council.

Part of the Khalqi Government
Following the coup, Watanjar was appointed deputy prime minister and minister of communications. Later he served successively as minister of the interior, of defense, and again of the interior until he joined others in a plot against Amin.

The Herat uprising also set off a new round in the Afghan regime's internal power struggle. To assuage charges of weak performance in the military leadership, Taraki finally granted Watanjar the position of Minister of Defense.

Watanjar's move to take over the Defense Ministry was a demonstrable exploitation of Amin's vulnerability in the aftermath of the failings of the army. However, by July 1979, Amin took over the defense portfolio, replacing him on the grounds that he was a Taraki-sympathizer.

Aslam Watanjar joined forces with Sarwari, Gulabzoy and others Khalqis in a plot against then Prime Minister Hafizullah Amin.

Except for Sarwari, who was from the province of Ghazni, the others were from Paktia. They had influence with the army, which was officered by a considerable number of persons from Paktia.

Until their break with Amin, Sarwari was head of the Intelligence Department (AGSA), while the others were cabinet ministers. At first close friends of Amin, they later turned against him, siding with President Nur Mohammad Taraki in opposition to Amin.

When Amin overcame them, they took refuge in the Soviet embassy along with Sarwari and Gulabzoy.

Part of the Parchami Government

The presence in Soviet Red Army of Sarwari, Watanjar, and Gulabzoy might have influenced the officers not to respond the invasion. Along with them, he served as a guide for the Soviets.

After the invasion he was promoted to membership in the central committee and the Revolutionary Council and was appointed Minister of Communications. In June 1981 he was added to the Politburo.

Later he served successively as Minister of Defense and again of the Interior.

He also headed the official Afghan delegation to Baikonur, in his position of communications minister and member of its ruling Politburo.

On March 6, 1990, General Watanjar intercepted a tank battalion of Shahnawaz Tanai during Tanai's coup attempt, which eventually failed. Watanjar was awarded a four-star rank by President Najibullah and he also became Secretary of Defense.

After the fall of Kabul and the collapse of President Najibullah's government, he left the country.

Later life and death
On 24 November 2000, Watanjar died of cancer while in exile, in the Ukrainian city of Odessa. He was 56.

References

1946 births
2000 deaths
Pashtun people
Collaborators with the Soviet Union
Afghan military personnel
People's Democratic Party of Afghanistan politicians 
Deaths from cancer in Ukraine
Afghan military officers
Communication ministers of Afghanistan
Defence ministers of Afghanistan
Interior ministers of Afghanistan